Beyond Belief is a feature documentary directed by Beth Murphy. The film follows Susan Retik and Patti Quigley, two women who lost their husbands on September 11, 2001, as they set up humanitarian programs for war widows in Afghanistan. It premiered at the 2007 Tribeca Film Festival.

On review aggregator website Rotten Tomatoes the film has an approval rating of 83% based on 12 critics, with an average rating of 6.9/10.

Film credits
Director: Beth Murphy
Producer: Beth Murphy
Associate Producer: Sean Flynn
Editors: Kevin Belli, Beth Murphy
Camera: Kevin Belli, Sean Flynn
Music: Evren Celimli
Translator: Luna Asrar

References

External links

Trailer

2007 documentary films
Documentary films about terrorism
Documentary films about the September 11 attacks
Films about terrorism
Documentary films about women
American documentary films
American independent films
Documentary films about the War in Afghanistan (2001–2021)
Films about widowhood
Documentary films about women in war
2007 independent films